This list represents the list of serving Admirals of Bangladesh Navy. Currently the Bangladesh Navy has 1 Admiral with 14 Rear Admirals & no Vice Admiral.

Current Bangladesh Navy Admirals 

 Admiral 		
 Admiral M Shaheen Iqbal, Chief of the Naval Staff (CNS), Naval Headquarters, Dhaka

Vice Admiral  

Vacant  

Rear Admiral 
 Rear Admiral Mohammad Nazmul Hassan , Assistant Chief of Naval Staff (Operations), ACNS (O) & Assistant Chief of Naval Staff (Personnel), ACNS (P) in addition 
 Rear Admiral Mohammad Moyeenul Haque, Assistant Chief of Naval Staff (Material), ACNS (M) and In Addition Assistant Chief of Naval Staff (Logistics) ACNS (Log)
 Rear Admiral M Shahjahan, Chairman Chattogram Port Authority, Chairman CPA, Ministry of Shipping
 Rear Admiral Mohammad Musa, Vice Chancellor of Bangabandhu Sheikh Mujibur Rahman Maritime University, VC BSMRMU
 Rear Admiral S M Abul Kalam Azad, High Commissioner of the People's Republic of Bangladesh, Maldives, Ministry of Foreign Affairs
 Rear Admiral Abdullah Al Mamun Chowdhury, BSP, ndc, psc. Commander Chattogram Naval Area, COMCHIT
 Rear Admiral Ashraful Hoq Chowdhury, Director General Bangladesh Coast Guard, DG (BCG), Ministry of Home Affairs
 Rear Admiral M Anwar Hossain Commander Khulna Naval Area, COMKHUL
 Rear Admiral Mohammad Sohail, Chairman Payra Port Authority, Chairman PPA, Ministry of Shipping
 Rear Admiral Khondkar Misbah-ul-Azim, Commander Dhaka Naval Area, COMDHAKA
 Rear Admiral Mir Ershad Ali, Chairman Mongla Port Authority, Chairman MPA, Ministry of Shipping
 Rear Admiral Shaheen Rahman, Dhaka
 Rear Admiral S M Moniruzzaman, Commander Bangladesh Navy Fleet (COMBAN)
 Rear Admiral Golam Sadeq, Senior Directing Staff (Navy), National Defense College, Mirpur, Dhaka

See also
 List of serving generals of the Bangladesh Army
 List of serving air marshals of the Bangladesh Air Force

References

External links and sources
 Inter Services Press Release (ISPR) Bangladesh

Bangladeshi Navy admirals
Bangladesh Navy